The Alberta Civil Trial Lawyers Association (ACTLA) is a non-profit society established in 1986 under the laws of the Province of Alberta, Canada.  Its members are principally civil trial lawyers who are members of the Law Society of Alberta.

ACTLA is dedicated to advancing the science of jurisprudence, training in all fields and phases of advocacy, upholding the honour and dignity of the profession of law, encouraging brotherhood and sisterhood among the members of the Alberta Bar, upholding and improving the adversarial system and trial by jury, and promoting the administration of justice and the public good.

See also
 Law Society of Alberta
 Canadian Bar Association

References 

Legal organizations based in Alberta
Bar associations of Canada
Organizations based in Edmonton